The German Congress on Crime Prevention (Deutscher Präventionstag - DPT) is an international conference for the field of crime prevention that takes place annually since 1995 in different German cities.

General Information
The aim of the German Congress on Crime Prevention (GCOCP) is to present and strengthen crime prevention within a broad societal framework. Thus it contributes to crime reduction as well as reducing both the fear of crime, and the number of victims of crime. As an annually organised congress, the main objectives of the Congress are:
 
 Presenting and exchanging current and basic questions of crime prevention and its effectiveness 
 Bringing together partners within the field of crime prevention
 Functioning as a forum for the practice of crime prevention and for fostering the exchange of expertise
 Helping to get into contact at the international level and to exchange information
 Discussing implementation strategies
 Developing and disseminating recommendations for practice, politics, administration and research in the field of crime prevention

In 2007 the Annual International Forum (AIF) within the GCOCP was established to address an international audience and to share their experiences in crime prevention.

Both the GCOCP and AIF are geared to people from all over the world working in all areas of crime prevention: 
administration, health system, youth welfare, judiciary, churches, local authorities, media, politics, police, prevention committees, projects, schools, organizations and associations, science etc.

So far the following congresses took place:
 
 1. GCOCP 1995 in Lübeck
 2. GCOCP 1996 in Münster
 3. GCOCP 1997 in Bonn
 4. GCOCP 1998 in Bonn
 5. GCOCP 1999 in Hoyerswerda
 6. GCOCP 2000 in Düsseldorf
 7. GCOCP 2001 in Düsseldorf
 8. GCOCP 2003 in Hanover
 9. GCOCP 2004 in Stuttgart
 10. GCOCP 2005 in Hanover
 11. GCOCP 2006 in Nuremberg
 12. GCOCP and 1. AIF 2007 in Wiesbaden
 13. GCOCP and 2. AIF 2008 in Leipzig
 14. GCOCP and 3. AIF 2009 in Hanover
 15. GCOCP and 4. AIF 2010 in Berlin
 16. GCOCP and 5. AIF 2011 in Oldenburg
 17. GCOCP and 6. AIF 2012 in Munich
 18. GCOCP and 7. AIF 2013 in Bielefeld
 19. GCOCP and 8. AIF 2014 in Karlsruhe
 20. GCOCP and 9. AIF 2015 in Frankfurt am Main
 21. GCOCP and 10. AIF 2016 in Magdeburg
 22. GCOCP and 11. AIF 2017 in Hannover
 23. GCOSP and 12. AIF 2018 in Dresden

Organisation

The German Congress on Crime Prevention (GCOCP) on behalf of the German Foundation for Crime Prevention and Offender Support (DVS) is responsible for the organisation of the congress. Erich Marks is managing director of the GCOCP. Chairman of the DVS is Hans-Jürgen Kerner.

Partner

The GCOCP thrives on the commitment of the different organisations and institutes which participate as Congress Partners.

Permanent National Partners
 DBH
 German Forum for Crime Prevention (DFK)
 Police Crime Prevention at State and National Level (ProPK)
 The "White Ring" organisation

Permanent International Partners

 European Forum for Urban Security (EFUS)
 World Health Organization (WHO)
 UN-HABITAT
 Korean Institute of Criminology (KIC)

Programme Advisory Board

In preparation for each congress a programme advisory board shall be constituted where organiser and the permanent as well as the host program partners are represented. The programme advisory board is responsible for the content arrangement of the respective congress.Programme Advisory Board

Literature

 Marc Coester / Erich Marks (Ed.): International Perspectives of Crime Prevention 4: Contributions from the 4th and the 5th Annual International Forum 2010 and 2011 within the German Congress on Crime Prevention, Mönchengladbach 2012
 Coester, Marc / Marks, Erich (Ed.): International Perspectives of Crime Prevention - Contributions from the 3rd Annual International Forum, Mönchengladbach 2010
 Erich Marks / Wiebke Steffen (Ed.): Engagierte Bürger - Sichere Gesellschaft. Ausgewählte Beiträge des 13. Deutschen Präventionstages (2.-3. Juni 2008, Leipzig), Mönchengladbach 2009
 Marc Coester / Erich Marks (Ed.): International Perspectives of Crime Prevention 2 - Contributions from the 2nd Annual International Forum 2008, Mönchengladbach 2009
 Erich Marks / Wiebke Steffen (Ed.): Starke Jugend - Starke Zukunft. Ausgewählte Beiträge des 12. Deutschen Präventionstages (18.-19. Juni 2007, Wiesbaden), Mönchengladbach 2008
 Marc Coester / Erich Marks (Ed.): International Perspectives of Crime Prevention - Contributions from the 1st International Forum, Mönchengladbach 2008

References

External links
 German Congress on Crime Prevention (GCOCP)
 DPT-University
 Annual International Forum for Crime Prevention (AIF)
 Searching Platform of the DPT Institute
 Platform for Professionals

Crime prevention